Terry D. Breverton (born 1946) is a British former businessman and academic who has written many books on subjects mainly related to Wales and seamen.

Life

Terry Breverton was born in Birmingham in 1946. 
His parents were Welsh, and he was brought up in Wales.
He studied in England at the universities of Manchester and Lancaster.
He worked for many years in international business and consultancy.
He was a management consultant in the production industry, and a marketing director.
Breverton then became an academic, and lectured in Milan, Bologna and Wales.
He has been a senior lecturer at the University of Wales Institute in Cardiff  and a Fellow of the Institute of Consulting and a Fellow of the Chartered Institute of Marketing. He was awarded the Everett Helm Visiting Fellowship award of the University of Indiana in 2003, has twice been a guest speaker at the North American Festival of Wales (NAFOW) at Vancouver in 2003 and Washington in 2007 and gave the prestigious Bemis Lecture at Lincoln, Massachusetts in 2008.

Breverton has said that the skills he developed in research and writing as a management consultant transferred easily into writing history books.
In 2000 Breverton founded Glyndŵr Publishing and WalesBooks.com.
Glyndŵr Publishing published books by Breverton and other authors who were unable to get their non-fiction work on Wales accepted by other publishers.
Since 2008 he has been a full-time writer and editor, mainly writing for Apple, Quercus and Amberley.
He has also presented documentaries on the Discovery Channel and the History Channel.
Breverton is interested in reviving interest in Welsh culture and history, which has been the main focus of his books.
He has said, "The Welsh are treated as second-class citizens, and live in a country that is one of the most economically backward in Europe. They are rapidly becoming a minority in their own country."

Meic Stephens wrote of Breverton's 100 Great Welshmen and 100 Great Welsh Women in the Western Mail Magazine on 16 March 2002, "These are not necessarily books that you want to read from cover to cover, but to browse in ... Both are really extraordinary achievements by a single author whose industry and enterprise seem to show no bounds."
Breverton has won the Welsh Books Council "English Book of the Month" award on five occasions.

Publications

Notes

Sources

1946 births
Living people
Welsh writers